Perica Vukičević (born 29 September 1942) is a former Croatian handball player.

Vukičević is one of the original players of RK Kvarner. He was also part of the golden generation of Kvarner which was led by Vlado Stenzel in the Yugoslav First League from 1970-1974.

After retiring as a player he moved to Italy and coached various club.

Honours
Kvarner
Croatian Handball Champion (2): 1969, 1970
Croatian Unique League (1): 1969-70
Regional League of Primorje and Istra (3): 1966-67, 1967–68, 1968–69
Regional League of Rijeka and Karlovac (2): 1963-64, 1966–67
Regional League of Croatia (primorje) (1): 1964-65

Sources
Petar Orgulić - 50 godina rukometa u Rijeci (2004), Adriapublic

References

Yugoslav male handball players
Croatian male handball players
RK Kvarner players
Handball players from Rijeka
Croatian expatriate sportspeople in Italy
Yugoslav expatriate sportspeople in Italy
1942 births
Living people